The Great Rallye (Cape of Good Hope / Tierra del Fuego)  is a TV game show produced by the Community of French televisions and aired in 1984 on Antenne 2 (France), RTBF1 (Belgium), TSR (Switzerland), CBC Television (Canada), RTL Télévision (Luxembourg) and TMC (Monaco).

This program was carried out following the success of The Race around the world.

Principle of the issue 
Five two-men teams (one per channel), drove Citroen Visa cars for an extraordinary adventure, traveling around the world from the Cape of Good Hope to Tierra del Fuego, producing short TV documentary films that were noted by a professional jury based in Paris.

Jury 
The members of the standing jury representing television channels were:

 Sophie Hecquet (RTL Television)
 Bruno Albin (Antenna 2)
 Jean-Louis Boudou (Canadian Broadcasting Corporation)
 José Sacré (TMC)
 Vincent Philippe (TSR)

Winners 
 1at – The RTL team (Belgium): 3818 Points (Participants: Thierry Devillet Serge Goriely and Philippe Raymakers)
 2nd – The CBC team (Canada): 3785 Points (Participants: Robert Bourgoing and Francis Lévesque)
 3rd – The TMC Team (Monte Carlo): 3751 Points (Participants: Christine Demond and Guilène Merland)
 4th – The SSR team SSR (French Switzerland): 3682 Points (Participants: Alexandre Bochatay and Alain Margot)
 5th – The Antenne 2 team (France): 3658 Points (Participants: Laurent Chomel, Roland Théron and Georges Siciliano)

See also 
 Race Around the World

References 
 Didier Regnier, L'Aventure du Grand Raid Ed Robert Laffont
 Pierre Kohler, Grand Raid, Le Cap-Terre De Feu, Ed Hachette Télé-Union
 Gauthier Fleuri, Les Maillantes, ou 242 jours autour de la planète Terre, Ed. Pierre Theubet

External links

 The website of the Grand Raid  (created by former Canadian competitor Robert Bourgoing)
 The Great Raid photos on Flickr

1980s French television series
1980s Canadian game shows
1984 French television series debuts
1984 Canadian television series debuts
French game shows
French documentary television series
1980s Canadian documentary television series
La Une original programming
TMC (TV channel) original programming